Hubertus Karel Gerardus "Huub" Jansen (born 30 September 1962) is a Dutch former cricket umpire. Jansen serves as a member of the ICC Associate and Affiliate Panel of Umpires representing the Netherlands. Jansen retired from umpiring in September 2021.

Umpiring career 
Jansen stood in matches during the 2016 ICC World Cricket League Division Five tournament in Jersey in May 2016.

On 16 June 2018, he stood in his first Twenty20 International (T20I) match, between Ireland and Scotland. On 3 August 2018, he stood in his first One Day International (ODI) match, between the Netherlands and Nepal. In April 2019, he was named as one of the eight on-field umpires for the 2019 ICC World Cricket League Division Two tournament in Namibia.

See also
 List of One Day International cricket umpires
 List of Twenty20 International cricket umpires

References 

1962 births
Living people
Dutch cricket umpires
Dutch One Day International cricket umpires
Dutch Twenty20 International cricket umpires